The 2010 GEKO Ypres Rally was the 45th running of the Ypres Rally and the sixth round of the 2010 Intercontinental Rally Challenge (IRC). The event was held between 24–26 June 2010 and was based in the town of Ypres, Belgium.

Introduction
The rally was held over two days with a total of  covered in nineteen asphalt special stages. Friday had six stages with Saturday having a total of thirteen stages. In addition to IRC frontrunners Juho Hänninen, Jan Kopecký and Kris Meeke, other entries in S2000 cars included Freddy Loix (Škoda Fabia S2000) and factory Proton pair, Chris Atkinson and Alister McRae.

Results 
The event was dominated by local driver Freddy Loix after two of the main title contenders crashed out of the rally; Juho Hänninen on stage four and Kris Meeke on stage eight. In addition to these retirements both Proton's failed to finish due to engine problems related to valve spring failures. The win was the fifth different winner of an IRC round this season, the fourth for Škoda and its first with the facelift Fabia.

The Ypres Historic Rally normally runs at the same time as the main event. In 2010, the winner was Robert Droogmans, a Belgian racing driver competing with Marc Duez.

Overall standings

Special stages

References

Ypres
Ypres Rally
2010 in Belgian motorsport